Huizing is a surname. Notable people with the surname include:

Daan Huizing (born 1990), Dutch golfer
Matthijs Huizing (born 1960), Dutch politician and sports manager

See also
Huizinga